Coid is a surname. Notable people with this surname include:

 Danny Coid (born 1981), English footballer
 Jeremy Coid, English psychiatrist
 Marshall Coid, musician that worked in several 
 Moses A. McCoid (1840–1904), American army officer

See also
 COID, also known as the Central Oregon Irrigation District